St Andrew's College, also known as StAC, in Christchurch, New Zealand, is a private, co-educational school that enrols from pre-school to secondary Year 13. It was founded in 1917 and it is the only independent, co-educational primary and secondary school in New Zealand's South Island. Although now a fully co-educational school, it was formerly an all-boys school. It became fully co-educational in 2001. The current rector of St Andrew's College is Christine Leighton.

History

St Andrew's College was founded by Rev. Alexander Thomas Thompson in 1917 in the Scottish Presbyterian tradition of the Christian faith.

The school began in a humble fashion with 19 boys and four teachers, driven by the determination of the Reverend Thompson, whose driving ambition was to ‘educate the sons of the Presbyterian and Scottish community of Canterbury.’

StAC had three boarding houses for the 165 boarders of years 9 to 13: MacGibbon (years 9 to 11) and Rutherford (years 11 to 13) for boys, and Thompson (years 9 to 13) for girls. Boarding facilities were damaged in the 2011 Christchurch earthquake; as a result, the boarders have lived in local motels until the new boarding houses were opened at the start of 2013. Thompson and Rutherford houses have been demolished and replaced with new facilities while McGibbon House has been refurbished and strengthened. Boarding used to be available for year 7 and 8 students, but is no longer provided. St Andrew's College has four houses: Rutherford, MacGibbon, Thompson and Erwin.

On 31 October 2008, the students and teachers of St Andrew's College set a world record for the largest school mass dance with a recital of the YMCA.

In 2020, students of the school reported that a teacher tore down posters and verbally abused them for promoting the Black Lives Matter movement. The school conducted an investigation but did not publish the outcome.

Plans
The 22 February 2011 Christchurch earthquake severely damaged the school chapel and forced the closure of the school arts block and Strowan house, which both sustained some structural damage, however, most of the schools buildings were relatively undamaged, and the arts block has since been repaired and strengthened. Strowan house has now re-opened, and a new chapel has been built which incorporates design features from the original chapel. In late 2014 Erwin house was demolished to make room for a second gymnasium.

Recently the school has opened three new buildings including a fitness centre and a new library. The school expects to open a new theatre complex by March 2023.

Notable alumni

Albert Anderson (born 1961), rugby union player
Mark Abbott (born 1991), rugby union player
Andrew Bird (born 1967), Olympic coxswain
Ben Blair (born 1979), rugby union player
John Britten (1950–1995), inventor
Scott Cartwright (born 1954), rugby union player
Mark Chignell (born 1956), human factors researcher
Rod Donald (1957–2005), Member of Parliament
Joe Earl (born 1952), Olympic rower
Peter Gordon (1921–1991), Member of Parliament and cabinet minister
Eliza Grigg, alpine ski racer
Chris Harris (born 1969), cricketer
Hamish Hay (1927–2008), former Mayor of Christchurch
Phil Keoghan (born 1967), television presenter and host
Roy Kerr (born 1934), mathematician
Chris King (born 1981), rugby union player
Richie Mo'unga (born 1994), rugby union player
Carl Nixon (born 1967), novelist, short story writer and playwright
Gordon Ogilvie (1934–2017), historian
Tim Perry (rugby union) (born 1988), rugby union player 
Jack Rumbold (1920–2001), cricketer and colonial legal administrator
Sir Ieremia Tabai (born 1950), first president of Kiribati (1979–1991), politician
Philip Woollaston (born 1944), politician; vintner
Hugh Wilson (born 1945), botanist
Richard Wilson (born 1953), rugby union player
Rodney Wilson (1945-2013), art historian and museum director
Alex Wyllie (born 1944), rugby union player
Telusa Veainu (born 1990), rugby union player

References

External links
St Andrew's official site
Education Review Office report

Presbyterian schools in New Zealand
Boarding schools in New Zealand
Educational institutions established in 1917
Secondary schools in Christchurch
1917 establishments in New Zealand